Andrei Marius Gag (born 27 April 1991) is a Romanian athlete competing in the shot put and discus throw. He won the silver medal at the 2015 Summer Universiade.

His personal bests in the shot put are 21.06 metres outdoors (Cluj-Napoca 2015 – NR) and 20.89 metres indoors (Portland 2014). In addition, he has a personal best of 61.27 metres in the discus throw (Bucharest 2014).

Competition record

References

1991 births
Living people
Romanian male shot putters
Romanian male discus throwers
Place of birth missing (living people)
World Athletics Championships athletes for Romania
Athletes (track and field) at the 2016 Summer Olympics
Olympic athletes of Romania
Universiade medalists in athletics (track and field)
Universiade silver medalists for Romania
Universiade bronze medalists for Romania
Medalists at the 2015 Summer Universiade
Medalists at the 2017 Summer Universiade